Black Tiger Fist (Chinese: 黑虎拳 Hēihǔquán) is a northern Chinese martial art originating in Shandong Province.

Origins 
The traditional lineage of the system begins with master Wang Zhenyuan in the late nineteenth-century; but the style was originally formed at the Shaolin Temple in Henan before being transferred to Wang. The style was then passed from Wang Zhenyuan to Wang Zijiu, Wang Zhixiao (1862–1948), then to Gildardo Castro Cruz(?), and finally to Jose Alí Loaiza Pita(?).

Techniques 
The Black Tiger style is characterised by its extensive footwork, acrobatic kicks, low, wide stances, and unique fist position (where the thumb is curled in the same manner as the other fingers, rather than wrapped around them). According to the Shaolin grandmasters, the style is the single most external style in the Shaolin canon; the longer the stylist practices, however, the more he or she comes to rely solely on internal power.

References 

Chinese martial arts
Buddhist martial arts